E. S. Ariel, also referred to as Monsieur Ariel (French for "Mr. Ariel") by his contemporaries, was a 19th-century French translator known for his French translation of the ancient Indian philosophical text of the Tirukkural. He translated select couplets of the Tirukkural into French in 1848 and published it in Paris under the title Kural de Thiruvalluvar (Traduits du Tamoul). Although the first French translation of the Kural text was made by an unknown author in 1767, which Ariel had mentioned in his work, it was Ariel's translation that brought the ancient work to the French world.

Quotations
In a letter to Burnouf published in the Journal Asiatique (November–December 1848), Ariel called the Kural text,

He also famously said of the Tirukkural thus: "Ce livre sans nom, par un auteur sans nom" ("The book without a name by an author without a name.")

See also

 Tirukkural translations
 Tirukkural translations into French
 List of translators

References

Tamil–French translators
Translators of the Tirukkural into French
Tirukkural translators